The Americas Zone was one of three zones of regional competition in the 2000 Fed Cup.

Group I
Venue: Santinho Coast, Florianópolis, Brazil (outdoor clay)
Date: 25–30 April

The ten teams were divided into two pools of five teams. The teams that finished first in the pools played-off to determine which team would partake in the World Group Play-offs next year. The two nations coming last in the pools were relegated to Group II for 2001.

Pools

Play-off

  advanced to 2001 World Group Play-offs.
  and  relegated to Group II in 2001.

Group II
Venue: Maya C.C., La Libertad, El Salvador (outdoor clay)
Date: 9–13 May

The fourteen teams were randomly divided into two pools of four and two pools of three teams to compete in round-robin competitions. The play-off stage of the group was used to determine placings. The top two teams from each pool would be drawn in a knockout stage to determine which teams would be promoted, while the remaining teams played-off to determine the other placings.

Pools

Play-offs

  and  advanced to Group I for 2001.

See also
Fed Cup structure

References

 Fed Cup Profile, Canada
 Fed Cup Profile, Venezuela
 Fed Cup Profile, Brazil
 Fed Cup Profile, Uruguay
 Fed Cup Profile, Argentina
 Fed Cup Profile, Colombia
 Fed Cup Profile, Mexico
 Fed Cup Profile, Paraguay
 Fed Cup Profile, Dominican Republic
 Fed Cup Profile, Trinidad and Tobago
 Fed Cup Profile, Ecuador
 Fed Cup Profile, Bahamas
 Fed Cup Profile, Panama
 Fed Cup Profile, Antigua and Barbuda
 Fed Cup Profile, Puerto Rico
 Fed Cup Profile, Guatemala
 Fed Cup Profile, Bermuda
 Fed Cup Profile, Bolivia
 Fed Cup Profile, El Salvador
 Fed Cup Profile, Costa Rica

External links
 Fed Cup website

 
Americas
Sport in Florianópolis
Tennis tournaments in Brazil
La Libertad Department (El Salvador)
Tennis tournaments in El Salvador